The 2022 UCI Oceania Tour was the 18th season of the UCI Oceania Tour.

The UCI ratings from highest to lowest were are as follows:
 Multi-day events: 2.1 and 2.2
 One-day events: 1.1 and 1.2

Events

References

External links
 

 
UCI Oceania Tour
UCI Oceania Tour
UCI Oceania Tour